lighttpd (pronounced "lighty") is an open-source web server optimized for speed-critical environments while remaining standards-compliant, secure and flexible. It was originally written by Jan Kneschke as a proof-of-concept of the c10k problem – how to handle 10,000 connections in parallel on one server,
but has gained worldwide popularity. Its name is a portmanteau of "light" and "httpd".

Premise
The low memory footprint (compared to other web servers), small CPU load and speed optimizations  make lighttpd suitable for servers that are suffering load problems, or for serving static media separately from dynamic content. lighttpd is free and open-source software and is distributed under the BSD license. It runs natively on Unix-like operating systems, as well as Microsoft Windows.

Application support
lighttpd supports the FastCGI, SCGI and CGI interfaces to external programs, allowing web applications written in any programming language to be used with the server.  As a particularly popular language, PHP performance has received special attention. Lighttpd's FastCGI can be configured to support PHP with opcode caches (like APC) properly and efficiently. Additionally, it has received attention from its popularity within the Python, Perl, Ruby and Lua communities. Lighttpd also supports WebDNA, the resilient in-memory database system designed to build database-driven websites. It is a popular web server for the Catalyst and Ruby on Rails web frameworks. Lighttpd does not support ISAPI.

Features
 Load balancing, CGI, FastCGI, SCGI, HTTP proxy, Servlet AJP, WebSocket tunnel support
 chroot support
 Web server event mechanism performance – select(), poll(), and epoll()
 Support for more efficient event notification schemes like kqueue and epoll
 Conditional URL rewriting (mod_rewrite)
 TLS/SSL with SNI support, via OpenSSL, GnuTLS, Mbed TLS, NSS, WolfSSL.
 Authentication against an LDAP or DBI server
 RRDtool statistics
 Rule-based downloading with possibility of a script handling only authentication
 Server Side Includes support (but not server-side CGI from SSI)
 Flexible virtual hosting
 Modules support
 Lua programming language scripts via mod_magnet 
 WebDAV support
 HTTP compression using mod_deflate (zlib, brotli, zstd)
 Light-weight (less than 1 MB)
 Single-process design with only several threads. No processes or threads started per connection.
 HTTP/2 support since lighttpd 1.4.56
 HTTP/2 WebSocket support since lighttpd 1.4.65

Limitations
 Versions below 1.4.40 do not officially support sending large files from CGI, FastCGI, or proxies unless X-Sendfile is used.  This limitation has been removed in lighttpd 1.4.40.
 No HTTP/3 support

Usage
Lighttpd was used in the past by several high-traffic websites, including Bloglines, xkcd, Meebo, and YouTube. The Wikimedia Foundation also once ran Lighttpd servers.

See also

 Comparison of web server software
 Internet Cache Protocol
 Proxy server which discusses client-side proxies
 Reverse proxy which discusses origin-side proxies
 Traffic Server
 Web accelerator which discusses host-based HTTP acceleration

References

Further reading

External links
 

Cross-platform free software
Free software programmed in C
Free web server software
Unix network-related software
Web server software for Linux
Windows Internet software